Ras el Ain (Lit. The place lies in a very green and fertile plain, about one kilometer from the sea coast. It is a popular tourist destination, owing to its artesian wells fed by underground springs and collected in stone reservoirs that have been maintained through the ages. It has been the main source of water for ancient Tyre since Phoenician days. One of the reservoirs fed the arched aqueducts of the Roman period, and which once stretched all the way to Tyre. Remains of these aqueducts, exhibiting strong and excellent masonry, with round arches and a continuous cornice above them, can still be seen today, and a short stretch of the original aqueduct is still used today in Tyre's present-day waterworks.

A reference to this place is mentioned in the 3rd century Mosaic of Rehob as Rosh Mayya (Fountain-head).

In 1881, the PEF's Survey of Western Palestine (SWP) described it: "A village built of stone, containing about 100 Metawileh, in the plain, surrounded by gardens of figs, pomegranates, mulberries, and olives. Five mills in the village, and near, in working order,a good many ruined."

They further noted about the water-ways: This is the spring-head which supplied ancient Tyre by means of a long aqueduct. The springs are enclosed in four strongly-built reservoirs, as at Tabghah, by means of which the water is raised to a height of from fifteen to twenty feet, in order that an aqueduct with a slight fall should be able to carry it to the neighbourhood of Tyre. The walls of these reservoirs are of large well-dressed ashlar-work, and vary in thickness. The stones are joined and coated on the inside with strong cement. The principal reservoir is octagonal in shape, with sides of irregular length. Its diameter measures sixty-six feet, and it is twenty-five feet above the ground. The retaining walls are very thick, and show traces of modern repairs in one part. They have so gentle a slope that it is not difficult to ride up on to the broad border eight feet wide round the spring."

See also
 Tyre District

References

Bibliography

 
 (p. 432)
  (pp. 203-208)

External links
Survey of Western Palestine, Map 1:   IAA, Wikimedia commons
Ras el-Ain, in the Tyre District, Lebanon

Populated places in Tyre District
Shia Muslim communities in Lebanon
Archaeological sites in Lebanon
Roman aqueducts outside Rome
Geography of Lebanon